Marie-Catherine Silvestre, born Marie-Catherine Hérault (1680–1743) was a French painter.

Born in Paris, Silvestre was the daughter of Charles-Antoine Hérault and his wife Marie-Geneviève, who were her first teachers. In 1706 she married the painter Louis de Silvestre, moving with him in 1716 to Dresden. The couple's daughter Marie-Maximilienne became a pastellist. Silvestre died in Dresden, the year before her husband retired and returned to Paris. Her surviving pastels show the influence of Rosalba Carriera.

References

1680 births
1743 deaths
French women painters
18th-century French painters
18th-century French women artists
Painters from Paris
Artists from Dresden
Pastel artists